Sérgio Toledo Segall or simply Sérgio Toledo (born in São Paulo, Brazil in 1956) is the son of actress Beatriz Segall and an award-winning Brazilian screenwriter and director most known for his film Vera, that won the Silver Bear for Best Actress for Ana Beatriz Nogueira and a nomination for Golden Bear (best film) at the 37th Berlin International Film Festival.

Filmography
1979: Braços cruzados, máquinas paradas
1987: Vera
1991: One Man's War

References

External links
 

1956 births
Living people
Brazilian film directors
People from São Paulo
Lafer-Klabin family